Iphimediidae is a family of amphipods belonging to the order Amphipoda.

Genera:
 Acanthozoma Boeck, 1876
 Anchiphimedia Barnard, 1930
 Anisoiphimedia Karaman, 1980
 Coboldus Krapp-Schickel, 1974
 Echiniphimedia Barnard, 1930
 Gnathiphimedia Barnard, 1930
 Iphimedia Rathke, 1843
 Iphimediella Chevreux, 1911
 Labriphimedia Barnard, 1931
 Maxilliphimedia Barnard, 1930
 Maximilliphimedia Barnard, 1930
 Nodotergum Bellan-Santini, 1972
 Paranchiphimedia Ruffo, 1949
 Parapanoploea Nicholls, 1938
 Pariphimedia Chevreux, 1906
 Pseudiphimediella Schellenberg, 1931
 Stegopanoploea Karaman, 1980

References

Amphipoda
Crustacean families